Release Me may refer to:

Albums
 Release Me (Barbra Streisand album), 2012
 Release Me (The Like album) or the title song, 2010
 Release Me (Lyle Lovett album) or the title song, 2012
 Release Me (Micah Stampley album), 2010
 Release Me, by Engelbert Humperdinck, 1967

Songs
 "Release Me" (1949 song), written by Eddie Miller and Robert Yount; recorded by many artists
 "Release Me" (Agnes song), 2008
 "Release Me" (Deborah Conway song), 1992
 "Release Me" (Hooverphonic song), 2020
 "Release Me" (Oh Laura song), 2007
 "Release Me" (Wilson Phillips song), 1990
 "Release Me" (Zoë Badwi song), 2008
 "Release Me", by Jack's Mannequin from People and Things, 2011
 "Release Me", by Mae from Singularity, 2007
 "Release Me", by Miki Howard from Femme Fatale, 1992
 "Release Me", by Oh Land from Fauna, 2008
 "Release Me", by Tonic from Tonic, 2010